Time Traveler(s) or Time Traveller(s) may refer to:
 Time traveler, a person who engages in time travel

Film and television
 The Time Travelers (1964 film), a science fiction film by Ib Melchior
 Time Travelers (1976 film), a telefilm starring Sam Groom
 Time Traveller: The Girl Who Leapt Through Time, a 2010 Japanese film
 The Lovers (2013 film) or Time Traveller 
 "The Time Travelers" (How I Met Your Mother), an episode of How I Met Your Mother
 Time Traveler, a 1972 Japanese television series based on The Girl Who Leapt Through Time
 The Time Traveler, a 1993 TV documentary by Norman Lewis
 Time Traveler, a 2001 compilation of three episodes of Where on Earth Is Carmen Sandiego?

Literature
 The Time Travellers, a 2005 novel by Simon Guerrier
 The Time Traveller (fanzine), a science fiction fanzine started in 1932
 Time Travelers Quartet, a series of young adult books by Caroline B. Cooney
 Gideon the Cutpurse or The Time Travelers, a 2006 children's novel by Linda Buckley-Archer
 "The Time Traveller" (short story), a 1990 short story by Isaac Asimov
 To Say Nothing of the Dog, Time Travelling Historians trying to locate the Bishop's bird stump
 Time Traveler: A Scientist's Personal Mission to Make Time Travel a Reality, a 2006 book by Ronald Mallett
 Time Travelers, Ghosts, and Other Visitors, a 2003 collection of short stories by Nina Kiriki Hoffman
 "The Time-Traveler", a story by Spider Robinson in Callahan's Crosstime Saloon
 The Time Traveller, the protagonist of The Time Machine by H. G. Wells

Music
 Time Traveller (Keith LeBlanc album) (1992)
 Time Traveller (The Moody Blues album) (1994)
 Time Traveller, a 2011 album by Chris Norman
 Time Travellers, a 1992 album by O Terço
 Time Traveler, a 2006 album by Rahul Sharma
 Time Traveller, a 1980 album by Billy Thorpe
 "Time Traveler", a 1997 song by Angelo from Planet Gemini

Video games
 Time Travelers (video game), a 2012 video game developed by Level-5
 Time Traveler (1980 video game), an adventure game
 Time Traveler (video game), a 1991 arcade game

Other uses
 Time Traveler (roller coaster), a roller coaster at Silver Dollar City
 Time Traveler, a 1999 trick puzzle by Stave Puzzles

See also 
 Chrononaut (disambiguation)
 Time Machine (disambiguation)
 Time travel (disambiguation)